Peggy de Villiers (born 22 September 1993) is a South African deaf swimmer. She represented South Africa at the Deaflympics in 2009 and 2013. She made her Deaflympic debut at the 2009 Summer Deaflympics and claimed 4 medals including a gold medal in the 50m backstroke event with a world record breaking timing of 31.11 for deaf swimming at that time. She currently holds the deaf world swimming records in the women's 50m butterfly and women's 100m butterfly categories. She completed her undergraduated swimming career with the University of West Florida as a member of the college team.

Biography 
Peggy was born to Almero de Villiers and Marika de Villiers on 22, September 1993 and grew up in Somerset West, South Africa. She contracted bacterial meningitis when she was just 6 months old. Despite her deafness, Peggy started swimming at the age of 12. Peggy wears a hearing aid. She has a brother, Ollie de Villiers. Peggy de Villiers studied at the Somerset College High School.

Career 
Peggy de Villiers became a successful deaf swimmer at the age of sixteen after her dream debut at the 2009 Summer Deaflympics claiming gold medal in the women's 50m backstroke, silver medals in women's 100m backstroke, women's 100m freestyle and a bronze medal in women's 50m butterfly.

Apart from Deaflympics, she has competed at the World Deaf Swimming Championships in 2011 and 2015, claiming medals in individual women's backstroke, freestyle, butterfly events.

References

External links 
 Profile at Deaflympics
 Profile at ICSD
Profile at collegeswimming

1993 births
Living people
South African female swimmers
Deaf swimmers
People from Somerset West
South African deaf people
Sportspeople from the Western Cape
20th-century South African women
21st-century South African women